The  was an army of the Imperial Japanese Army that formed a garrison force in Korea under Japanese rule. The Korean Army consisted of roughly 350,000 troops in 1914.

History
Japanese forces occupied large portions of the Empire of Korea during the Russo-Japanese War of 1904–1905, and a substantial  was established in Seoul to protect the Japanese embassy and civilians on March 11, 1904. After the Annexation of Korea by the Empire of Japan in 1910, this force was renamed the Chosen Chusatsugun, and was further renamed the Japanese Korean Army on June 1, 1918. The primary task of the Korean Army was to guard the Korean peninsula against possible incursions from the Soviet Union; however, its units were also used for suppression of nationalist uprisings and political dissent within Korea itself. The Korean Army also came to the assistance of the Kwantung Army in its unauthorized invasion of Manchuria in 1931. In 1941, the Army was subordinated to the General Defense Command.

While Seishirō Itagaki (板垣 征四郎) was commander of the Chosen Army from 7 July 1939 to 7 April 1945, Japan began assembling its nuclear weapons program with the industrial site near the Chosen reservoir as its equivalent to the Oak Ridge laboratory for the United States' Manhattan Project. Both Itagaki and Masanobu Tsuji (辻 政信) refused to support neither peace between Japan and the United States nor have Japan attack the Soviet Union during Nazi Germany's Operation Barbarosa. It may have altered world history. Tsuji planned to assassinate Fumimaro Konoe if Konoe had Japan attack the Soviet Union during Operation Barbarosa and maintain peace with the United States.

In 1945, as the situation in the Pacific War was turning increasingly against Japan, the Army was transformed into the Japanese Seventeenth Area Army, and subsequently placed under the overall administrative command of the Kwantung Army. Its two undermanned infantry divisions were unable to withstand the massive Soviet Red Army armored and amphibious assault on Korea during the Soviet invasion of Manchuria. After the surrender of Japan, the Army south of the 38 parallel remained armed under operational command of the United States Army to maintain public order until the arrival of substantial Allied forces to take control.

List of Commanders

Commanding officer

Chief of Staff

References

External links

See also
Korea under Japanese rule
Armies of the Imperial Japanese Army

Field armies of Japan
Korea under Japanese rule
Military units and formations established in 1904
Military units and formations disestablished in 1945
Japan–South Korea military relations